In shogi, King's Head Vanguard Pawn or King's Side Vanguard Pawn (玉頭位取り gyoku tō kuraidori) is a Static Rook opening.

This opening utilizes a Boat castle in which the king (if played by Black) is positioned on 78 square. The pawn referred to then is the one on the seventh file that is originally at the head of the castled king (77). 

The term vanguard pawn (位取り kuraidori, literally "position taking") refers to a positioning of a pawn advanced to the middle rank supported by generals as a phalanx-like attacking formation.

This pawn becomes a vanguard pawn by advancing to the middle rank 5 (75 square) supported by the left silver at the 76 square.

Overview 
In the case of Black, the silver takes position at the 7th file, and is placed at 76. If the game is played well, it will be difficult for the ranging rook side to make progress in castling and to utilize the right knight. On the other hand, the static rook's king will have wide room, and it will be in a thick formation that cannot be easily defeated, and there will be no shortage of attacks available from the position. In actual play, as seen in the diagram, there are cases in which the game is also played from the 8th or 6th files. The winning pattern of this strategy is basically to avoid fighting in the opening of the game and to keep the positions alive from the middle-game to the endgame. If multiple positions are gained, then the player can show an attack on the king's head to put pressure on the opponent while gathering pieces for the endgame.

However, it is said to have the disadvantage that it takes a lot of moves until the formation is completed, and the king's line is unstable in the middle of the move, allowing a Fourth File Rook to attack first with S-44 and P-55, and allowing a Third File Rook to switch to Ishida style, and also allowing Ranging Rook to set up a position to its advantage. To escape the pressure, building an Anaguma castle is also a strong countermeasure. 
 
Although it is very similar to a Static Rook Anaguma as a tactic that prevents a sudden turnover once it becomes advantageous, it is also a fact that Anaguma, which has the characteristic of being very hard to checkmate, can simplify the reading at the endgame. When the superiority of Static Rook Anaguma became apparent, it became relatively obsolete, and the number of times King's Vanguard Head appears in professional tournaments has decreased drastically. During the heyday of the Fujii System, there was a possibility that it would become popular again as an endurance strategy for Static Rook, but it never regained its mainstream position as an endurance strategy due to the decline of the Fujii system.

Introduction

The King's Head Vanguard Pawn position uses a High Silver Fortress castle.

See also

 Static Rook

Bibliography

External links

 Commentary Of Shogi Game's YouTube channel:
 #6 Static Rook King's Head Vanguard Pawn vs Central Rook
 #13 Static rook King's Head Vanguard Pawn vs Fourth file Rook
 Fédération Belge de Shogi: King's Head Vanguard Pawn vs Ranging Rook
 Yamajunn's Basic Shogi Opening: 
 Gote Naka Bisha §B. Jikyusen lines: (1) Gyokutou Kuraidori
 Gote Sanken Bisha §Jikyusen lines: (3) Gyoku tou Kurai dori
 Yamajunn's Shogi News: Gyokutou Kuraidori
 戦法図鑑: (list of animated opening diagrams) 
 玉頭位取り戦法 #1
 玉頭位取り戦法 #2
 玉頭位取り戦法 #3
 玉頭位取り戦法 #4

Shogi openings
Static Rook openings